The coat of arms of the Transvaal was the official heraldic symbol of the South African Republic from 1866 to 1877 and again from 1881 to 1902, and later the symbol of the Transvaal Province from 1954 to 1994 in a simplified form.  It is now obsolete.

History
The South African Republic was established in 1857.  On 18 February 1858, the Volksraad (legislature) resolved that the new state should have the following coat of arms:

The earliest known appearance of the arms was on banknotes issued in 1866.  The crudely drawn arms were depicted as a shield with a lion, an anchor, and a man in the upper half, an ox-wagon in the lower half, and the motto 'Eendragt maakt magt' (sic, cf. Flag of the SAR) on a riband across the top.  This rendition also appeared on the Staatscourant (government gazette) from 1867.

A better version, in which the shield was divided into sections, an eagle was perched on top, and three flags were draped down each side, first appeared on the postage stamps in 1869, and this became the preferred rendition.  From 1871, this too appeared on the banknotes, and from 1872 it was on the masthead of the Staatscourant.

The arms were in abeyance during the British occupation of the Transvaal, from 1877 to 1881.  Revived in 1881, they became obsolete again when the republic ceased to exist in 1902.

In 1950, the Transvaal provincial administration decided to adopt the old arms as provincial arms and commissioned chief archivist Dr Coenraad Beyers to investigate and report on the most suitable version.  The arms were apparently introduced in 1954, and they were used until the province ceased to exist in 1994.

Blazon

The arms were recorded at the College of Arms in July 1955, and registered at the Bureau of Heraldry in October 1967.  The official blazon is:

 An oval shield per fess, the chief divided per pale;  dexter  Gules, a natural lion contourne couchant gardant Or; sinister Azure, a bearded man  in  national dress  wearing  a hat and bandolier, and holding in the left hand a gun resting upon the ground; in base Vert, a  Voortrekker  wagon proper; on an inescutcheon Argent an anchor Sable, cabled Gules.
 Perched on the shield an eagle displayed Or.
 Motto: EENDRACHT MAAKT MAGT

See also
 Coat of arms of the Cape Colony
 Coat of arms of Natal
 Coat of arms of the Orange Free State
 Coat of arms of the Orange River Colony
 Coat of arms of South Africa
 South African heraldry

References

Footnotes

Notations
 Beyers, C. (1950).  'Die Wapen van Die Suid-Afrikaanse Republiek' in Archives Year Book (1950)
 Brownell, F.G. (1993).  National and Provincial Symbols.
 Engelbrecht, C.L. (1987).  Money in South Africa
 Pama, C. (1965).  Lions and Virgins.

External links
 South African Heraldry Website

Transvaal
South African heraldry
South African Republic
Transvaal
Transvaal
Transvaal
Transvaal
Transvaal
Transvaal